Events from the year 1824 in Denmark.

Incumbents
 Monarch – Frederick VI
 Prime minister – Otto Joachim

Events

Undated

Births
 23 October – Carsten Henrichsen, painter (died 1897)
 30 October – Christen Dalsgaard, painter (died 1897)

Deaths
 6 June – Charlotte Baden, writer (died 1824)

Full date missing
  Luise Gramm, writer (born 1746)

References

 
1820s in Denmark
Denmark
Years of the 19th century in Denmark